D502 is a state road connecting D27 state road and the D424 expressway Tromilja interchange to a number of settlements in Zadar hinterland and A1 motorway Zadar 2 interchange (via D424).

D502 is a connecting route providing a bypass of A1 motorway Maslenica Bridge and D8 state road Maslenica Bridge in case of strong winds.

Originally the road extended to Zadar itself, however in April 2010, the road was shortened in order to cancel the existing intersection with the Zadar Airport runway. The intersection used to be guarded by traffic signs and barriers similar to the ones found near at-grade railroad crossings.

The road, as well as all other state roads in Croatia, is managed and maintained by Hrvatske ceste, state owned company.

Traffic volume 

Traffic is regularly counted and reported by Hrvatske ceste, operator of the road. Substantial variations between annual (AADT) and summer (ASDT) traffic volumes are attributed to the fact that the road carries substantial tourist traffic in Zadar area.

Road junctions and populated areas

Sources

State roads in Croatia
Transport in Zadar County